Adam Didur or Adamo Didur (24 December 18747 January 1946) was a famous Polish operatic bass singer. He sang extensively in Europe and had a major career at New York's Metropolitan Opera from 1908 to 1932.

Career
He was born on 24 December 1874 in Wola Sękowa near Sanok, Poland. Didur studied in Lwów with Walery Wysocki and later with Franz Emmerich in Milan. He made his vocal debut as a soloist at a concert  performance of Ludwig van Beethoven's Ninth Symphony in Milan, Italy. His operatic stage debut came in 1894 as Méphistophélès in Gounod's Faust in Rio de Janeiro. Besides South America, he also toured Egypt and Italy in 1894, including the small town of Pierolo near Turin where he met his first wife, a Mexican singer Angela Aranda Arellano.

After steady years at Warsaw Opera from 1899 to 1903, Didur launched a career at major European opera houses. His guest appearances in Spain and Russia in 1903 were followed by La Scala years 1903-1906, first appearing there as Wotan in Das Rheingold. His debut at London's Royal Opera House, Covent Garden, was in the role of Colline in La bohème on the opening night of the 1905 season (Nellie Melba was Mimì). He travelled later to Argentina, singing in Buenos Aires in the 1905–1908 operatic seasons. In 1914, he returned to London to sing Baron Archibaldo at the British premiere of Montemezzi's L'amore dei tre re and a few other roles.

His North American debut was as Alvise in Ponchielli's La Gioconda at the second season opening of Hammerstein's Manhattan Opera House. It was the night of "Golden Age" stars, also featuring American debuts of Giovanni Zenatello as Enzo and Jeanne Gerville-Réache as La Cieca, while Lillian Nordica sang the title role, Mario Ancona was Barnaba and Eleanora de Cisnero was Laura. A year later, Metropolitan Opera engaged Didur as Méphistophélès in Gounod's Faust at the inauguration of the new Brooklyn Academy of Music to be followed two days later by his Ramfis in Giuseppe Verdi's Aida. On this all-star opening night of the 1908 season, Arturo Toscanini was in the pit and the rest of the cast included Emmy Destinn in her Met debut as Aida, Enrico Caruso (Radames), Louise Homer (Amneris) and Antonio Scotti (Amonasro). He remained with the company for a quarter of a century and became one of its principal bass singers, counting 933 performances in 55 roles.

It was at the Met in 1913 that he appeared in the title role of Boris Godunov in the American premiere of Mussorgsky's opera. Didur created the roles in three operas by Giacomo Puccini at the Met, La fanciulla del West and the Il tabarro and Gianni Schicchi of the Il Trittico trilogy. He also appeared at the world premiere of Humperdinck's Die Königskinder. His other important "firsts" at the Met include the US premieres of Mozart's Così fan tutte, Smetana's The Bartered Bride, Borodin's Prince Igor (singing both Prince Galitzky and Khan Konchak), and Montemezzi's L'amore dei tre re. He also sang under the baton of Gustav Mahler in Mozart's Le nozze de Figaro, Smetana's The Bartered Bride and the Met premiere of Tchaikovsky's The Queen of Spades. Didur's last appearance at the Met was in the role of Coppélius in Les Contes d'Hoffmann on 11 February 1932. His voice had been on the wane for some time and he returned to live in Europe.

Two months before the outbreak of World War II, Didur was appointed director of the Warsaw Opera, but the 1939 bombardment, almost completely destroying the opera building, made work impossible. He continued his work as a professor in Lwów and then Katowice, where he also started working on founding an opera company. Soon after the war ended in 1945, he was appointed the first director of the Silesian Opera., which opened with the performance of Moniuszko's opera Halka that Didur produced.

He died on 7 January 1946 in Katowice.

Family
Didur was twice married; with his first wife, the Mexican singer Angela Aranda Arellano (1874–1928), he had five children, two of whom later became singers themselves, including Eva Didur and Olga Didur-Wiktorowa. After her death he married the French dancer Marguerite Vignon in 1928.

Legacy
Didur's large, sonorous and magnificently rich-toned voice was in its prime between the late 1890s and the World War I period. It was particularly suited to the performance of Italian operas. He was a versatile stylist with the unusual agility and his vocal range was astonishingly wide, allowing him to also sing baritone roles such as Tonio in Pagliacci and Count Almaviva in Le nozze de Figaro. Although chiefly a basso cantante, Didur could effectively deliver deep richness of basso profondo that made him one of the foremost interpreters of Boris Godunov. He was also especially praised for his portrayal of Mefistofele in both Gounod's and Boito's operas, and Rossini's Don Basilio.  He made many memorable recordings of operatic arias which are available on CD transfers.

Selected repertoire
Méphistophélès in Faust by Gounod
Boris in Boris Godunov by Mussorgskij
Marcel in Les Huguenots by Meyerbeer
Ramfis in Aida by Verdi
Colline in La Bohème by Puccini
Mefistofele in Mefistofele by Boito
Coppélius in Les Contes d’Hoffmann by Offenbach
Sparafucile in Rigoletto by Verdi
Galitskij in Prins Igor by Borodin
Leporello in Don Giovanni by Mozart
Archibaldo in L’Amore dei tre re by Montemezzi
Filippo II in Don Carlo by Verdi
Don Basilio in Il barbiere di Siviglia by Rossini
Figaro in Le nozze di Figaro by Mozart
Count Almaviva in Le nozze di Figaro by Mozart
Tomskij in Spardame [The Queen of Spades] by Tchaikovsky
Kezal in Svatební košile [The Bartered Bride] by Dvořák
Tonio in I pagliacci by Leoncavallo
Klingsor in Parsifal by Wagner
Oberthal in Le prophète by Meyerbeer
Don Alfonso in Così fan tutte by Mozart
Mustafà in L’Italiana in Algeri by Rossini
Alvise Badoero in La Gioconda by Ponchielli
Scarpia in Tosca by Puccini
Billy Jackrabbit in La Fanciulla del West by Puccini
Talpa in Il Tabarro by Puccini
Simone in Gianni Schicchi by Puccini
Trehogger in Königskinder by Humperdinck
Il Cieco in Iris by Mascagni
Franz in Lodoletta by Mascagni
Gremin in Eugene Onegin by Tchaikovsky
Pistol in Falstaff by Verdi
Giovanni Filippo Palm in Germania by Franchetti
Hu-Tsin in L’Oracolo by Leoni

Discography
Didur recorded for G & T, Fonotipia, Pathé and Brunswick labels. Selections from his recorded arias and songs were reissued on compact discs:
Lebendige Vergangenheit, Preiser (89198)
Club "99" (CD 99-89)
Hafg (Hamburger Archiv für Gesangskunst ) Vol. 1, 1904-16 (10073)
Hafg (Hamburger Archiv für Gesangskunst ) Vol. 2, 1900-03 (10074)

References

Further reading
L. de Noskowski: ‘Adamo Didur’, The Record Collector, Vol 16 (1964), pg. 4–23.
Michael Scott, The Record of Singing. Vol 1: To 1914. Duckworth: London, 1979, pg. 120-1.
Karl-Josef Kutsch and Leo Riemens, Großes Sängerlexikon, Vol. 4. Munich: K. G. Saur, 2003, pg. 1163-4.
David Ewen, Encyclopedia of the Opera: New Enlarged Edition.  New York; Hill and Wang, 1963.
Harold Rosenthal and John Warrack (editors), The Concise Oxford Dictionary of Opera (second edition). London; Oxford University Press, 1980.

External links 
 Biography of Adam Didur at Opera Vivrà

1874 births
1946 deaths
Operatic basses
People from Sanok
Fonotipia Records artists
Lviv Conservatory alumni
Polish male singers
20th-century Polish male  opera singers